Wide-field Infrared Survey Explorer (WISE, observatory code C51, Explorer 92 and SMEX-6) is a NASA infrared astronomy space telescope in the Explorers Program. It was launched in December 2009, and placed in hibernation mode in February 2011, before being re-activated in 2013 and renamed the Near-Earth Object Wide-field Infrared Survey Explorer (NEOWISE). WISE discovered thousands of minor planets and numerous star clusters. Its observations also supported the discovery of the first Y-type brown dwarf and Earth trojan asteroid.

WISE performed an all-sky astronomical survey with images in 3.4, 4.6, 12 and 22 μm wavelength range bands, over ten months using a  diameter infrared telescope in Earth orbit. After its solid hydrogen coolant depleted, a four-month mission extension called NEOWISE was conducted to search for near-Earth objects (NEO) such as comets and asteroids using its remaining capability.

The WISE All-Sky (WISEA) data, including processed images, source catalogs and raw data, was released to the public on 14 March 2012, and is available at the Infrared Science Archive.

In August 2013, NASA announced it would reactivate the WISE telescope for a new three-year mission to search for asteroids that could collide with Earth. Science operations and data processing for WISE and NEOWISE take place at the Infrared Processing and Analysis Center at the California Institute of Technology in Pasadena, California.

In July 2021, NASA extended the NEOWISE mission until at least June 2023.

Mission goals 
The mission was planned to create infrared images of 99% of the sky, with at least eight images made of each position on the sky in order to increase accuracy. The satellite orbited above the terminator, its telescope pointing always to the opposite direction to the Earth, except for pointing towards the Moon, which was avoided, and its solar cells towards the Sun. Each image covers a 47 arcminute field of view (FoV), which means a 6 arcsecond resolution. Each area of the sky was scanned at least 10 times at the equator; the poles were scanned at theoretically every revolution due to the overlapping of the images. The produced image library contains data on the local Solar System, the Milky Way, and the more distant Universe. Among the objects WISE studied are asteroids, cool and dim stars such as brown dwarfs, and the most luminous infrared galaxies.

Targets within the Solar System 
WISE was not able to detect Kuiper belt objects, because their temperatures are too low. Pluto is the only Kuiper belt object that was detected. It was able to detect any objects warmer than 70–100 K. A Neptune-sized object would be detectable out to 700 Astronomical unit (AU), a Jupiter mass object out to 1 light year (63,000 AU), where it would still be within the Sun's zone of gravitational control. A larger object of 2–3 Jupiter masses would be visible at a distance of up to 7–10 light years.

At the time of planning, it was estimated that WISE would detect about 300,000 main-belt asteroids, of which approximately 100,000 will be new, and some 700 Near-Earth objects (NEO) including about 300 undiscovered. That translates to about 1000 new main-belt asteroids per day, and 1–3 NEOs per day. The peak of magnitude distribution for NEOs will be about 21–22 V. WISE would detect each typical Solar System object 10–12 times over about 36 hours in intervals of 3 hours.

Targets outside the Solar System 
Star formation, which are covered by interstellar dust, are detectable in infrared, since at this wavelength electromagnetic radiation can penetrate the dust. Infrared measurements from the WISE astronomical survey have been particularly effective at unveiling previously undiscovered star clusters. Examples of such embedded star clusters are Camargo 18, Camargo 440, Majaess 101, and Majaess 116. In addition, galaxies of the young Universe and interacting galaxies, where star formation is intensive, are bright in infrared. On this wavelength the interstellar gas clouds are also detectable, as well as proto-planetary discs. WISE satellite was expected to find at least 1,000 of those proto-planetary discs.

Spacecraft 
The WISE satellite bus was built by Ball Aerospace & Technologies in Boulder, Colorado. The spacecraft is derived from the Ball Aerospace & Technologies RS-300 spacecraft architecture, particularly the NEXTSat spacecraft built for the successful Orbital Express mission launched on 9 March 2007. The spacecraft is three-axis stabilized, with body-fixed solar arrays. It uses a high-gain antenna in the Ku-band to transmit to the ground through the Tracking and Data Relay Satellite System (TDRSS) geostationary system. Ball also performed the testing and flight system integration.

Telescope 

Construction of the WISE telescope was divided between Ball Aerospace & Technologies (spacecraft, operations support), SSG Precision Optronics, Inc. (telescope, optics, scan mirror), DRS Technologies and Rockwell International (focal planes), Lockheed Martin (cryostat, cooling for the telescope), and Space Dynamics Laboratory (instruments, electronics, and testing). The program was managed through the Jet Propulsion Laboratory.

The WISE instrument was built by the Space Dynamics Laboratory in Logan, Utah.

Mission 

WISE surveyed the sky in four wavelengths of the infrared band, at a very high sensitivity. Its design specified as goals that the full sky atlas of stacked images it produced have 5-sigma sensitivity limits of 120, 160, 650, and 2600 microjanskies (µJy) at 3.3, 4.7, 12, and 23 µm (aka microns). WISE achieved at least 68, 98, 860, and 5400 µJy; 5 sigma sensitivity at 3.4, 4.6, 12, and 22 µm for the WISE All-Sky data release. This is a factor of 1,000 times better sensitivity than the survey completed in 1983 by the IRAS satellite in the 12 and 23 µm bands, and a factor of 500,000 times better than the 1990s survey by the Cosmic Background Explorer (COBE) satellite at 3.3 and 4.7 µm. On the other hand, IRAS could also observe 60 and 100 µm wavelengths.

 Band 1 – 3.4 µm (micrometre) – broad-band sensitivity to stars and galaxies
 Band 2 – 4.6 µm – detect thermal radiation from the internal heat sources of sub-stellar objects like brown dwarfs
 Band 3 – 12 µm – detect thermal radiation from asteroids
 Band 4 – 22 µm – sensitivity to dust in star-forming regions (material with temperatures of 70–100 kelvins)

The primary mission lasted 10 months: one month for checkout, six months for a full-sky survey, then an additional three months of survey until cryogenic coolant (which kept the instruments at 17 K) ran out. The partial second survey pass facilitated the study of changes (e.g. orbital movement) in observed objects.

Congressional hearing - November 2007 
On 8 November 2007, the House Committee on Science and Technology's Subcommittee on Space and Aeronautics held a hearing to examine the status of NASA's Near-Earth Object (NEO) survey program. The prospect of using WISE was proposed by NASA officials.

NASA officials told Committee staff that NASA plans to use WISE to detect [near-Earth objects in addition to performing its science goals. It was projected that WISE could detect 400 NEOs (or roughly 2% of the estimated NEO population of interest) within its one-year mission.

Results 
By October 2010, over 33,500 new asteroids and comets were discovered, and nearly 154,000 Solar System objects had been observed by WISE.

Discovery of an ultra-cool brown dwarf, WISEPC J045853.90+643451.9, about 10~30 light years away from Earth, was announced in late 2010 based on early data. In July 2011, it was announced that WISE had discovered the first Earth trojan asteroid, . Also, the third-closest star system, Luhman 16.

As of May 2018, WISE / NEOWISE has also discovered 290 near-Earth objects and comets (see section below).

Project milestones 
The WISE mission is led by Edward L. Wright of the University of California, Los Angeles. The mission has a long history under Wright's efforts and was first funded by NASA in 1999 as a candidate for a NASA Medium-class Explorer (MIDEX) mission under the name Next Generation Sky Survey (NGSS). The history of the program from 1999 to date is briefly summarized as follows:
 January 1999 — NGSS is one of five missions selected for a Phase A study, with an expected selection in late 1999 of two of these five missions for construction and launch, one in 2003 and another in 2004. Mission cost is estimated at US$139 million at this time.
 March 1999 — WIRE infrared telescope spacecraft fails within hours of reaching orbit.
 October 1999 — Winners of MIDEX study are awarded, and NGSS is not selected.
 October 2001 — NGSS proposal is re-submitted to NASA as a MIDEX mission.
 April 2002 — NGSS proposal is accepted by the NASA Explorer office to proceed as one of four MIDEX programs for a Pre-Phase A study.
 December 2002 — NGSS changes its name to Wide-field Infrared Survey Explorer (WISE).
 March 2003 — NASA releases a press release announcing WISE has been selected for an Extended Phase-A study, leading to a decision in 2004 on whether to proceed with the development of the mission.
 April 2003 — Ball Aerospace & Technologies is selected as the spacecraft provider for the WISE mission.
 April 2004 — WISE is selected as NASA's next MIDEX mission. WISE's cost is estimated at US$208 million at this time.
 November 2004 — NASA selects the Space Dynamics Laboratory at Utah State University to build the telescope for WISE.
 October 2006 — WISE is confirmed for development by NASA and authorized to proceed with development. Mission cost at this time is estimated to be US$300 million.

 14 December 2009 — WISE successfully launched from Vandenberg Air Force Base, California.
 29 December 2009 — WISE successfully jettisoned instrument cover.
 6 January 2010 — WISE first light image released.
 14 January 2010 — WISE begins its regular four wavelength survey scheduled for nine months duration. It is expected to cover 99% of the sky with overlapping images in the first 6 months and continuing with a second pass until the hydrogen coolant is exhausted about three months later.
 25 January 2010 — WISE detects a never-before-seen near Earth asteroid, designated 2010 AB78.
 11 February 2010 — WISE detects a previously unknown comet, designated P/2010 B2 (WISE).
 25 February 2010 — WISE website reports it has surveyed over 25% of the sky to a depth of 7 overlapping image frames.
 10 April 2010 — WISE website reports it has surveyed over 50% of the sky to a depth of 7 overlapping image frames.
 26 May 2010 — WISE website reports it has surveyed over 75% of the sky to a depth of 7 overlapping image frames.
 16 July 2010 — Press release announces that 100% sky coverage will be completed on 17 July 2010. About half of the sky will be mapped again before the instrument's block of solid hydrogen coolant sublimes and is exhausted.
 October 2010 — WISE hydrogen coolant runs out. Start of NASA Planetary Division funded NEOWISE mission.
 January 2011 — Entire sky surveyed to an image density of at least 16+ frames (i.e. second scan of sky completed).

Hibernation
 17 February 2011 — WISE Spacecraft transmitter turned off at 20:00 UTC by principal investigator Ned Wright. The spacecraft will remain in hibernation without ground contacts awaiting possible future use.

 14 April 2011 — Preliminary release of data covering 57% of the sky as seen by WISE.
 27 July 2011 — First Earth trojan asteroid discovered from WISE data.
 23 August 2011 — WISE confirms the existence of a new class of brown dwarf, the Y dwarf. Some of these stars appear to have temperatures less than 300 K, close to room temperature at about 25 °C. Y dwarfs show ammonia absorption, in addition to methane and water absorption bands displayed by T dwarfs.
 14 March 2012 — Release of the WISE All-Sky data to the scientific community.
 29 August 2012 — WISE reveals millions of black-holes.
 20 September 2012 — WISE was successfully contacted to check its status.
 21 August 2013 — NASA announced it would recommission WISE with a new mission to search for asteroids.

Reactivation
 19 December 2013 — NASA releases a new image taken by the reactivated WISE telescope, following an extended cooling down phase. The revived NeoWise mission is underway and collecting data.
 7 March 2014 — NASA reports that WISE, after an exhaustive survey, has not been able to uncover any evidence of "planet X", a hypothesized planet within the Solar System.
 26 April 2014 — The Penn State Center for Exoplanets and Habitable Worlds reports that WISE has found the coldest known brown dwarf, between −48 °C and −13 °C, 7.2 light years away from the Sun.
 21 May 2015 — NASA reports the discovery of WISE J224607.57-052635.0, the most luminous known galaxy in the Universe.
 July 2021, NASA extended the NEOWISE mission until at least June 2023.

History

Launch 
The launch of the Delta II launch vehicle carrying the WISE spacecraft was originally scheduled for 11 December 2009. This attempt was scrubbed to correct a problem with a booster rocket steering engine. The launch was then rescheduled for 14 December 2009. The second attempt launched on time at 14:09:33 UTC from Vandenberg Air Force Base in California.

WISE avoided the problem that affected Wide Field Infrared Explorer (WIRE), which failed within hours of reaching orbit in March 1999. In addition, WISE was 1,000 times more sensitive than prior surveys such as IRAS, AKARI, and COBE's DIRBE.

"Cold" mission 
A month-long checkout after launch found all spacecraft systems functioning normally and both the low- and high-rate data links to the operations center working properly. The instrument cover was successfully jettisoned on 29 December 2009. A first light image was released on 6 January 2010: an eight-second exposure in the Carina constellation showing infrared light in false color from three of WISE's four wavelength bands: Blue, green and red corresponding to 3.4, 4.6, and 12 µm, respectively. On 14 January 2010, the WISE mission started its official sky survey.

The WISE group's bid for continued funding for an extended "warm mission" scored low by a NASA review board, in part because of a lack of outside groups publishing on WISE data. Such a mission would have allowed use of the 3.4 and 4.6 µm detectors after the last of cryo-coolant had been exhausted, with the goal of completing a second sky survey to detect additional objects and obtain parallax data on putative brown dwarf stars. NASA extended the mission in October 2010 to search for near-Earth objects (NEO).

By October 2010, over 33,500 new asteroids and comets were discovered, and over 154,000 Solar System objects were observed by WISE. While active it found dozens of previously unknown asteroids every day. In total, it captured more than 2.7 million images during its primary mission.

NEOWISE (pre-hibernation) 

In October 2010, NASA extended the mission by one month with a program called Near-Earth Object WISE (NEOWISE). Due to its success, the program was extended a further three months. The focus was to look for asteroids and comets close to Earth orbit, using the remaining post-cryogenic detection capability (two of four detectors on WISE work without cryogenic). In February 2011, NASA announced that NEOWISE had discovered many new objects in the Solar System, including twenty comets. During its primary and extended missions, the spacecraft delivered characterizations of 158,000 minor planets, including more than 35,000 newly discovered objects.

Hibernation and recommissioning 
After completing a full scan of the asteroid belt for the NEOWISE mission, the spacecraft was put into hibernation on 1 February 2011. The spacecraft was briefly contacted to check its status on 20 September 2012.

On 21 August 2013, NASA announced it would recommission NEOWISE to continue its search for near-Earth objects (NEO) and potentially dangerous asteroids. It would additionally search for asteroids that a robotic spacecraft could intercept and redirect to orbit the Moon. The extended mission would be for three years at a cost of US$5 million per year, and was brought about in part due to calls for NASA to step up asteroid detection after the Chelyabinsk meteor exploded over Russia in February 2013.

NEOWISE was successfully taken out of hibernation in September 2013. Its instruments were then re-calibrated, and the first post-hibernation photograph was taken on 19 December 2013.

NEOWISE (post-hibernation) 

The post-hibernation NEOWISE mission was anticipated to discover 150 previously unknown near-Earth objects and to learn more about the characteristics of 2,000 known asteroids. The average albedo of asteroids larger than  discovered by NEOWISE is 0.14.

The telescope was turned on again in 2013, and by December 2013 the telescope had cooled down sufficiently to be able to resume observations. Between then and May 2017, the telescope made almost 640,000 detections of over 26,000 previously known objects including asteroids and comets. In addition, it discovered 416 new objects and about a quarter of those were near-Earth objects classification.

 262 NEAs (subset of NEOs)
 47 PHAs (subset of NEAs)
 28 comets

Of the 262 near-Earth asteroids (NEAs), 47 of them are considered potentially hazardous asteroids (PHAs), a subset of the much larger family of NEOs, but particularly more likely to hit Earth and cause significant destruction. NEOs can be divided into NECs (comets only) and NEAs (asteroids only), and further into subcategories such as Atira asteroids, Aten asteroids, Apollo asteroids, Amor asteroids and the potentially hazardous asteroids (PHAs).

NEOWISE has provided an estimate of the size of over 1,850 near-Earth objects, helping us better understand our nearest solar system neighbors. For two more years (1 July 2021 – 30 June 2023), NASA's Near-Earth Object Wide-field Infrared Survey Explorer (NEOWISE) will continue its hunt for asteroids and comets – including objects that could pose a hazard to Earth. This mission extension means NASA's prolific near-Earth object (NEO) hunting space telescope will continue operations until 30 June 2023.

NEOWISE's replacement, the next-generation NEO Surveyor, is currently scheduled to launch in 2026, and will greatly expand on what we have learned, and continue to learn, from NEOWISE.

Data releases 
On 14 April 2011, a preliminary release of WISE data was made public, covering 57% of the sky observed by the spacecraft. On 14 March 2012, a new atlas and catalog of the entire infrared sky as imaged by WISE was released to the astronomic community. On 31 July 2012, NEOWISE Post-Cryo Preliminary Data was released. A release called AllWISE, combining all data, was released on 13 November 2013. NEOWISE data is released annually.

In 2018, the reliability of the data was challenged in a paper by Nathan Myhrvold, who stated that the NEOWISE data suffers from systemic errors due to the spacecraft being designed to observe very distant objects rather than asteroids in the Solar System; NASA responded that they are "confident the processes and analyses performed by the Neowise team are valid, as verified by independent researchers".

unWISE and CatWISE 

The Allwise co-added images were intentionally blurred, which is optimal for detecting isolated point sources. This has the disadvantage that many sources are not detected in crowded regions. The unofficial, unblurred coadds of the WISE imaging (unWISE) creates sharp images and masks defects and transients. unWISE coadded images can be searched by coordinates on the unWISE website. unWISE images are used for the citizen science projects Disk Detective and Backyard Worlds.

In 2019, a preliminary catalog was released. The catalog is called CatWISE. This catalog combines the WISE and NEOWISE data and provides photometry at 3.4 and 4.6 µm. It uses the unWISE images and the Allwise pipeline to detect sources. CatWISE includes fainter sources and far more accurate measurement of the motion of objects. The catalog is used to extend the number of discovered brown dwarfs, especially the cold and faint Y dwarfs. CatWISE is led by Jet Propulsion Laboratory (JPL), California Institute of Technology, with funding from NASA's Astrophysics Data Analysis Program. The CatWISE preliminary catalog can be accessed through Infrared Science Archive (IRSA).

Discovered objects 

In addition to numerous comets and minor planets, WISE also discovered many brown dwarfs including some quite close the Sun in the context of solar neighborhood; these bodies are sort of dim stars expected to be about the size of Jupiter just a few light years from Earth. The other extraordinary discovery, was first Earth trojan, an asteroid in a special orbital relationship common to extremely large planets like Jupiter. Many other observations across the sky lead to many detentions, such of distant galaxies also.

Brown dwarfs 
The nearest brown dwarfs discovered by WISE within 20 light-years include:

Before the discovery of Luhman 16 in 2013, WISE 1506+7027 at a distance of  light-years was suspected to be closest brown dwarf on the list of nearest stars (also see ).

Directly-imaged exoplanets 
Directly imaged exoplanets first detected with WISE. See Definition of exoplanets: IAU working definition as of 2018 requires Mplanet ≤ 13  and Mplanet/Mcentral < 0.04006. Mmin and Mmax are the lower and upper mass limit of the planet in Jupiter masses.

Minor planets 

WISE is credited with discovering 3,088 numbered minor planets. Examples of the mission's numbered minor planet discoveries include:

Comet C/2020 F3 (NEOWISE) 

On 27 March 2020, the comet C/2020 F3 (NEOWISE) was discovered by the WISE spacecraft. It eventually became a naked-eye comet and was widely photographed by professional and amateur astronomers. It was the brightest comet visible in the northern hemisphere since comet Hale-Bopp in 1997.

Gallery

Full sky views by WISE

Selected images by WISE

Map with nearby WISE stars

See also 
 Explorer program
 Infrared astronomy
 List of largest infrared telescopes
 Nemesis (hypothetical star)
 Tyche (hypothetical planet)
 NEO Surveyor, a successor to NEOWISE

References

External links 

 
 
 
 
 

 
2009 in spaceflight
Explorers Program
Infrared telescopes
NASA space probes
Near-Earth object tracking
Space telescopes
Spacecraft launched by Delta II rockets